Anthony Howe may refer to:

Anthony Howe (historian)
Anthony Howe (sculptor)

See also 
 Howe (surname)